Anatoli Lukianchikov (born 28 February 1975) is a retired Moldovan football striker.

References

1975 births
Living people
Moldovan footballers
CS Tiligul-Tiras Tiraspol players
FC Kryvbas Kryvyi Rih players
PFC Spartak Nalchik players
FK Ventspils players
FC Luch Vladivostok players
FC Okzhetpes players
Association football forwards
Moldovan expatriate footballers
Expatriate footballers in Ukraine
Moldovan expatriate sportspeople in Ukraine
Expatriate footballers in Latvia
Moldovan expatriate sportspeople in Latvia
Expatriate footballers in Russia
Moldovan expatriate sportspeople in Russia
Expatriate footballers in Kazakhstan
Moldovan expatriate sportspeople in Kazakhstan
Moldova under-21 international footballers